Chrysotoxum verralli is a species of hoverfly belonging to the subfamily Syrphinae.

Distribution
This species is present in Europe, the eastern Palearctic realm, and the Near East.

Habitat
These flies live in grasslands, often close to trees.

Description
These species is a wasp-mimic, with yellow and black bands and long antennae. These bands are substantially parallel to the front edge of tergites. The black front edge of the tergite 2 is almost straight. The third antennal segment is shorter than segments 1 and 2 together. The female’s eyes are separated from each other.

This species is hard to distinguish and very similar to Chrysotoxum arcuatum, Chrysotoxum cautum, Chrysotoxum elegans and Chrysotoxum octomaculatum.

Etymology
The name honours George Henry Verrall.

References

 Collin, J. E. 1940. Notes on Syrphidae (Diptera). IV. Entomologist's mon. Mag. 76: 150-158.

Insects described in 1940
Diptera of Europe
Syrphinae
Taxa named by James Edward Collin